The Indian state of Arunachal Pradesh represents two Lok Sabha constituencies. Following the 25 July 2003 Congress split, Gegong Apang formed the state government with the help of the Bharatiya Janata Party (BJP). Congress had an alliance with its splinter group Arunachal Congress. Congress candidate and former Arunachal Congress leader Wangcha Rajkumar contested Arunachal East and AC candidate Kamen Ringu contested Arunachal West. Nationalist Trinamool Congress had a candidate in Arunachal West, competing against BJP. BJP won both seats with comfortable margins.

Ahead of the 2004 Lok Sabha elections Arunachal Congress talked about calling for a boycott as a protest against Chakma and Hajong refugees having been given the right to vote in the state. In the end the party did however decide to contest.

(*)= 1999 numbers are those of the Nationalist Congress Party.

Results by constituency

References

Indian general elections in Arunachal Pradesh
2000s in Arunachal Pradesh
Arunachal Pradesh